KBSA may refer to:

 KBSA (FM), a radio station (90.9 FM) licensed to serve El Dorado, Arkansas, United States
 KBSA-TV, former call sign of KFTR-DT, a television station (Channel 46) licensed to serve Ontario, California
 Knowledge Based Software Assistant, a research program funded by the United States Air Force
 Korea Baseball Softball Association, the South Korean governing body for the sports of baseball and softball
 Kuwait Boy Scouts Association